Knut Vollebæk (born 11 February 1946 in Oslo) is a former Norwegian diplomat to the United States, (2001–2007, and centrist politician (Norwegian Christian Democratic Party). He is currently a member of the International Commission on Missing Persons Board of Commissioners and heads a government commission investigating the situation of Norwegian Travellers.

Education 
He was educated at the Norwegian School of Economics. He also attended the University of Oslo and the University of California, Santa Barbara, as well as completing studies in the French language and culture at Institut Catholique de Paris and in the Spanish language and culture at the Universidad Complutense of Madrid.

Career 
In September 2013, he was elected to the Board of Commissioners of the International Commission on Missing Persons (ICMP).

Vollebæk was the OSCE High Commissioner on National Minorities from 2007 until 2013.

Prior to that, Vollebæk served as Ambassador to the United States between 2001 and 2007 and as Foreign Minister of Norway from 1997 to 2000. He was chairman-in-Office of the OSCE in 1999.

Vollebæk's diplomatic career includes assignments to New Delhi, Madrid and Harare. He was Norwegian Ambassador to Costa Rica in 1991–1993 and Assistant Secretary General at the Norwegian Ministry of Foreign Affairs from 1994 until he became Foreign Minister in 1997. He served as Deputy Co-Chairman of the International Conference on the Former Yugoslavia in 1993.

He was appointed Primus inter pares of the Panel of Eminent Persons on Strengthening the Effectiveness of the OSCE in 2005. He was Chairman of the Council of the Baltic Sea States in 1999–2000 and Chairman of the Barents Euro-Arctic Council in 1997–1998. Between October 1989 and November 1990, he was the Deputy Minister for Foreign Affairs of Norway.

References

Ambassadors of Norway to Costa Rica
Ambassadors of Norway to the United States
Christian Democratic Party (Norway) politicians
Foreign Ministers of Norway
Norwegian School of Economics alumni
Living people
1946 births
University of California, Santa Barbara alumni
Organization for Security and Co-operation in Europe
Grand Crosses 1st class of the Order of Merit of the Federal Republic of Germany
Recipients of the Order of the White Star, 1st Class
Politicians from Oslo